Rui Fernando da Gracia Gomes (born 28 May 1985), simply known as Rui, is a footballer who plays as a centre back. Born and raised in Spain to Cape Verdean parents, he has been naturalized by Equatorial Guinea, whose national team he has represented internationally.

Early life
Rui was born in Bembibre, Castile and León to Cape Verdean parents from São Nicolau, who had emigrated to Portugal in the mid-1970s and then to Spain.

Club career
Rui is a product of CA Bembibre. He has developed most of his club career in his homecountry Spain, also playing in Cyprus and Malta, where he was a two-time Maltese Premier League champion with Hibernians FC.

International career
Rui represented Cape Verde in the 2003 and 2009 editions of Mundialito, a Spanish-based tournament where the participant teams are entirely composed by amateur footballers from the different foreign diasporas in Spain and do not use to be linked to their respective official national teams. He was never contacted by the Cape Verdean Football Federation to play for the official Cape Verde national team. He also played for the Spanish autonomous team of Castile and León.

While playing for Spanish club CF Palencia, Rui was invited by Equatorial Guinean international midfielder Benjamín Zarandona, who was then his teammate, to become a naturalised citizen of Equatorial Guinea in order to play for its national team.

In July 2010, Rui received his first call for the Equatoguinean senior team and to play a friendly match against Morocco on 11 August 2010. However, he didn't attend due to injury.

Rui's first incursion with Equatorial Guinea on 12 October 2010, when he participated in a friendly lost against Botswana by 0–2 in Malabo.

Rui was part of the squad for the 2012 Africa Cup of Nations and the 2015 Africa Cup of Nations, being a first-choice defender for the Nzalang Nacional.

International goals
Scores and results list Equatorial Guinea's goal tally first.

References

External links

1985 births
Living people
People from El Bierzo
Sportspeople from the Province of León
Spanish people of Cape Verdean descent
Spanish sportspeople of African descent
Spanish footballers
Footballers from Castile and León
Cape Verdean footballers
Naturalized citizens of Equatorial Guinea
Equatoguinean footballers
Equatorial Guinea international footballers
2012 Africa Cup of Nations players
2015 Africa Cup of Nations players
Association football central defenders
Divisiones Regionales de Fútbol players
Tercera División players
Segunda División B players
Cypriot First Division players
Maltese Premier League players
Elche CF Ilicitano footballers
CF Palencia footballers
UD Logroñés players
Enosis Neon Paralimni FC players
Hibernians F.C. players
Spanish expatriate footballers
Cape Verdean expatriate footballers
Spanish expatriate sportspeople in Cyprus
Expatriate footballers in Cyprus
Spanish expatriate sportspeople in Malta
Expatriate footballers in Malta